Bledzianów  is a village in the administrative district of Gmina Ostrzeszów, within Ostrzeszów County, Greater Poland Voivodeship, in west-central Poland.

The village has a population of 402 that lives mostly from work in private farms (not exceeding the area of 20 ha) and nearby urban centers (Ostrzeszów, Ostrów Wielkopolski). The problem of agriculture in Bledzianów is the lack of specialization of farms and the poor quality of soils. The village is connected to the water supply system, but has no sewage system.

In the village there is a prayer chapel dedicated to Our Lady of Sorrows belonging to the parish of St. Anna in Niedźwiedz.

Bledzianów is also home of the renowned dog and Instagram celebrity pet Yoko since 2016.

References

Villages in Ostrzeszów County